Narvalo was the name of at least two ships of the Italian Navy and may refer to:

 , a  launched in 1906 and discarded in 1918.
 , a  launched in 1930 and lost in 1943.

Italian Navy ship names